Drenth is a Dutch toponymic surname indicating an origin in the province of Drenthe. Variant forms are Drent, Drenthe, Drenthen and Van Drenth. People with this surname include:

Elt Drenth (1949–1998), Dutch freestyle swimmer
Herman Drenth (1892–1932), Dutch-American serial killer known as "Harry Powers"
Jan Drenth (born 1925), Dutch chemist
Max Drenth (born 1963), Dutch writer, philosopher and columnist known as "Maxim Februari"
Drent
Ido Drent (born 1987), South African actor in New Zealand
Martin Drent (born 1970), Dutch football striker
Drenthe
Eugène Drenthe (1925–2009), Surinamese poet and playwright
Giovanni Drenthe (born 1990), Surinamese football striker
Royston Drenthe (born 1987), Dutch football winger and rapper

References

Dutch-language surnames
Dutch toponymic surnames